Marcusodictyon is a genus of problematic fossils. It has been considered the oldest bryozoan
in several publications. Taylor (1984) revised the systematics of the genus and removed it from Bryozoa. The fossil constitutes a phosphatic network of low ridges that enclose polygons about 0.3–1.2 mm wide that are generally 6-sided but can be 4-, 5- or 7-sided. The internal microstructure of Marcusodictyon is composed of
laminae parallel to external surfaces of ridges (Taylor 1984). Marcusodictyon occurs on late Cambrian and Tremadocian lingulate brachiopods of Baltica (Vinn 2015).

References

 Taylor, P.D. (1984). Marcusodictyon Bassler from the Lower Ordovician of Estonia: not the earliest bryozoan but a phosphatic problematicum. Alcheringa 8, 177–186.

Enigmatic prehistoric animal genera